Christine Amertil (born 18 August 1979 in Nassau, New Providence) is a Bahamian athlete competing mainly in the 400 metres. She graduated from Southeastern Louisiana University.

Achievements
 2006 IAAF World Indoor Championships – bronze medal
 3rd World Athletics Final – fifth place
 2004 Olympic Games – seventh place
 2nd World Athletics Final – fourth place
 2003 World Indoor Championships in Athletics – silver medal

References

External links
 
 

1979 births
Living people
Sportspeople from Nassau, Bahamas
Bahamian female sprinters
Athletes (track and field) at the 2007 Pan American Games
Athletes (track and field) at the 2015 Pan American Games
Athletes (track and field) at the 2000 Summer Olympics
Athletes (track and field) at the 2004 Summer Olympics
Athletes (track and field) at the 2008 Summer Olympics
Athletes (track and field) at the 2012 Summer Olympics
Athletes (track and field) at the 2016 Summer Olympics
Olympic athletes of the Bahamas
Pan American Games silver medalists for the Bahamas
Southeastern Louisiana University alumni
Commonwealth Games bronze medallists for the Bahamas
World Athletics Championships medalists
Athletes (track and field) at the 2002 Commonwealth Games
Athletes (track and field) at the 2006 Commonwealth Games
Athletes (track and field) at the 2010 Commonwealth Games
Athletes (track and field) at the 2014 Commonwealth Games
World Athletics Championships athletes for the Bahamas
Commonwealth Games medallists in athletics
Pan American Games medalists in athletics (track and field)
Central American and Caribbean Games gold medalists for the Bahamas
Competitors at the 2010 Central American and Caribbean Games
World Athletics Indoor Championships medalists
IAAF Continental Cup winners
Central American and Caribbean Games medalists in athletics
Medalists at the 2007 Pan American Games
Olympic female sprinters
Medallists at the 2010 Commonwealth Games